Cummersdale is a village in Cumbria, England, just outside the southern outskirts of Carlisle. Excavations have taken place in Cummersdale. Notable landmarks include the Cummersdale Viaduct and the Spinners Arms.

See also

Listed buildings in Cummersdale

References

External links
Cumbria County History Trust: Cummersdale (nb: provisional research only – see Talk page)

Villages in Cumbria
City of Carlisle